MatchesFashion.com is a London-based clothing retailer. The business operates online and via three stores in London.

History

Tom Chapman and Ruth Chapman opened the first store in Wimbledon Village in 1987, and opened an online store in 2007. In 2012, the Chapmans sold a  stake to venture capital firms to help build its online presence. In 2017, the founders sold the business to private equity firm Apax for an estimated 400 million.

Ajay Kavan stepped down as CEO of Matches Fashion in March 2021. In September 2021, Paolo de Cesare became CEO of Matches Fashion.

References

External links
 

 

Online retailers of the United Kingdom
Clothing retailers of the United Kingdom
Shops in London
Retail companies established in 1987
E-commerce
Fashion